Timothy Lawrence Smith (April 13, 1924 – January 20, 1997) was a historian and educator, known as the first American evangelical historian to gain notoriety in research and higher education.

Early life and education
Smith was born April 13, 1924 in Central, South Carolina, the son of Nazarene ministers. He earned his bachelor's and master's degrees from the University of Virginia, where he was a Thomas Jefferson Scholar and Phi Beta Kappa student, and his doctoral degree in history from Harvard University under Arthur M. Schlesinger, Sr.

Career
He has been described as "the first evangelical historian in the U.S. to make it in the secular research university."

Smith began his teaching career at the Eastern Nazarene College (ENC) in 1949 and left in 1954 to take a position at East Texas State University. During his time at ENC, he was the first director of Quincy School Department-sponsored College Courses, Inc., after which fellow Eastern Nazarene history professor Charles W. Akers transformed it into Quincy Junior College and served as its first full-time director. He later went on the teach at the University of Minnesota before becoming director of the American Religious History doctoral program and Chair of the Education Department at the Johns Hopkins University, where he taught for 25 years.

Smith received numerous awards and honors, and served as president of both the American Society of Church History, and the Society of Religious Historians. He was also an ordained elder in the Church of the Nazarene, and pastored churches in Massachusetts, Maine, and Colorado.

Published works
A prolific author who published in nearly every historical journal, Smith's best-known and most-praised work is his 1957 book Revivalism and Social Reform, formed from his dissertation from Harvard, which received the Brewer prize from the American Society of Church History. Smith also wrote a history of the Church of the Nazarene, Called Unto Holiness, which Smith considered his most outstanding accomplishment.

Legacy
Smith retired to Burke, Virginia but died at age 72 in West Palm Beach, Florida on January 20, 1997, after several strokes.

The Wesleyan Theological Society at Northwest Nazarene University established a book award in honor of Smith and Mildred Bangs Wynkoop in 1999, and presents an award annually. The 2008 recipient of the award, Randall J. Stephens, currently teaches at the Eastern Nazarene College, as well.

Notes and references

External links
Nazarene.org: Historiography of Timothy L. Smith
Nazarene.org: Smith's work online
Christianity Today Smith Obit

1924 births
1997 deaths
Harvard University alumni
University of Virginia alumni
Eastern Nazarene College faculty
American historians of religion
People from Central, South Carolina
Quincy College faculty
Texas A&M University faculty
University of Minnesota faculty
Johns Hopkins University faculty
American Nazarene ministers
20th-century American historians
20th-century American male writers
People from Burke, Virginia
American male non-fiction writers
Presidents of the American Society of Church History
20th-century American clergy
Historians from Virginia
Historians from Texas